WHNC (890 AM) is a licensed radio station.  As of December 2017, it is off-the-air.  It is licensed (though suspended in 2017) in Henderson, North Carolina, United States to The Paradise Network, its owner.  As of July 2022 its license is still in suspension.

References

External links

HNC
HNC
Radio stations established in 1944
1944 establishments in North Carolina